Galileo (30 March 1998 – 10 July 2021) was an Irish Thoroughbred racehorse and sire. In a racing career which lasted from October 2000 until October 2001, he ran eight times and won six races. He is best known for having won the Derby, Irish Derby and King George VI and Queen Elizabeth Stakes in 2001. He was named the European Champion Three-Year-Old Colt of 2001.

After his retirement, Galileo was one of the most sought-after sires in the world. He first became the leading sire in Great Britain and Ireland in 2008, then consecutively earned the title from 2010–2020. In 2020, he set the record for the number of Epsom Derby winners sired at five: New Approach, Ruler Of The World, Australia, Anthony Van Dyck and Serpentine. In June 2020, Galileo sired his 85th Group 1 winner, breaking Danehill's world record and becoming the most successful source of Group 1 winners in thoroughbred history. In addition to his Derby winners, his notable offspring include Frankel, Nathaniel, Found, Churchill and Minding. He was also a leading broodmare sire.

Galileo was euthanized on 10 July 2021, after a debilitating injury to his near foreleg which failed to heal after surgery earlier that year.

Background
Galileo was a  bay horse with a narrow white blaze and a white sock on his near hind leg. He was sired by Sadler's Wells out of the mare Urban Sea. His breeders were David Tsui, the owner of Urban Sea, and "Orpendale", a name used by the Coolmore Stud organisation for some of their breeding interests. He was described as a three-year-old as being "one of the most impeccably bred horses in training".

Sadler's Wells won three Group One races in 1984 and went on to sire the winners of over 2,000 races, including more than 130 at Group One/Grade I level. He was the most successful sire in the history of British racing, being the leading sire in Great Britain and Ireland a record 14 times. Urban Sea won the Prix de l'Arc de Triomphe in 1993 and went on to become an outstanding broodmare. Apart from Galileo, she was the dam of the Derby winner Sea the Stars and the Grade I winners Black Sam Bellamy (Tattersalls Gold Cup) and My Typhoon (Diana Stakes), as well as All Too Beautiful (Group race winner, Group One placed) and Melikah (Listed race winner, Group One placed).

Owned by Sue Magnier and Michael Tabor, Galileo was sent into training with Aidan O'Brien, then just starting his tenure at Ballydoyle. Galileo was ridden in all but one of his races by Michael Kinane.

Galileo was known for his relaxed behaviour and even temperament. Noel Stapleton, his long-time handler at Coolmore Stud, called him a creature of habit: "He is a true gentleman, and I think he knows how important he is." O'Brien noted that Galileo "prowled" when asked to walk: "Most horses when you ask them to go forward, up goes the head and they walk up, but he used to walk forward and walk out. His walking stride was so long and there was so much power from his front and back."

He was one of several horses to have borne the name of Galileo. The most notable "other" Galileo was a Polish-bred gelding which won the Grade I RSA Novices' Hurdle at the 2002 Cheltenham Festival.

Racing career

2000: two-year-old career
Galileo's two-year-old debut was delayed by a cough that he developed over the summer of 2000. He did not appear on the racecourse until 28 October, in a sixteen-runner maiden race at Leopardstown. He was made the even-money favourite, despite the field containing two runners each from the stables of the leading Irish trainers John Oxx and Jim Bolger. Kinane tracked the leaders before sending the colt into the lead in the straight and extending his lead to fourteen lengths by the finish.

2001: three-year-old career

Spring
Galileo was conditioned for a middle-distance campaign and aimed at Derby trial races in late spring. On his debut, he was 1/3 favourite for the Listed Ballysax Stakes over a mile and a quarter at Leopardstown,  which he won "easily" by three and a half lengths. Runner-up Milan went on to win the St Leger and finish second in the Breeders' Cup Turf, while the third-placed Vinnie Roe won four consecutive Irish St. Legers. O'Brien was satisfied with the performance, especially as he believed the colt was some way from peak fitness: ("[my horses]... are as big as bulls") and likely to improve.

Galileo was stepped up in class for the Group Three Derrinstown Stud Derby Trial at Leopardstown in May. The odds-on favourite, he was ridden for the first and only time by Seamie Heffernan, as Kinane was riding Milan in the Group One Prix Lupin on the same day. Galileo beat the John Oxx-trained Exaltation by one and a half lengths. Although Heffernan put Galileo under pressure before going clear, the colt's Derby odds were cut from 8–1 to 5–1.

Summer
At Epsom, Galileo started 11/4 joint-favourite with 2,000 Guineas winner Golan. The 2001 Epsom Derby field was strong, with Tobougg, the previous year's champion two-year-old, and the winners of most of the major Derby trials, including Mr Combustible (Chester Vase), Dilshaan (Dante Stakes) and Perfect Sunday (Lingfield Derby Trial), all taking part. Two furlongs from the finish, Galileo moved past Mr Combustible and quickly went clear to record an "impressive" three and a half length victory over Golan, Tobougg and Mr Combustible. Following the race, Timeform assigned a figure of 130 to Galileo, making him, in their opinion, the best Derby winner for ten years. Kinane was reported to have called Galileo the best horse he had ridden: "There is no weakness to him... He is a dream to ride." It was the first Derby winner for O'Brien and the first Derby winner Sadler's Wells had sired.

In the Irish Derby at The Curragh, three weeks later, Galileo was 4/11 favourite, with Golan and Exaltation the only other horses starting at less than 20/1. Although eased down in the closing stages, the colt won by four lengths from the Derby Italiano winner Morshdi, with Golan another four lengths back in third. Kinane, who was winning his first Irish Derby in seventeen attempts, said that he was always in "complete control", while Morshdi's jockey, Philip Robinson, described the winner as "a freak".

Galileo was then tested against older horses in the King George VI and Queen Elizabeth Diamond Stakes at Ascot in July. The betting suggested a match between Galileo (1/2 favourite) and the Godolphin five-year-old Fantastic Light (7-2), who had won Group One races in four different countries. Such were the reputations of these two horses that the third choice in the betting, the French Derby winner Anabaa Blue, started at 18/1. Kinane took Galileo to the lead two furlongs out, but Frankie Dettori challenged hard on Fantastic Light as Galileo won by two lengths.

Autumn

Galileo returned to Leopardstown in September for a much-anticipated Irish Champion Stakes against Fantastic Light again, this time over the shorter distance of one and a quarter miles. O'Brien's Ice Dancer was to act as pacemaker and ensure a stamina test. The plan failed, as the rest of the riders ignored Ice Dancer, who went ten lengths clear before stopping abruptly in the straight. Fantastic Light and Galileo raced side by side, with the former winning by a head. The race has been described as one of the most exciting and memorable in the modern history of the sport. O'Brien praised the winner but felt that he himself had "messed up" tactically.

For his final race, Galileo was sent to Belmont Park for the Breeders' Cup Classic. He would be racing on dirt for the first time, although he was prepared by exercising on the artificial surface at Southwell. In the Classic, Galileo finished sixth of the fourteen runners behind Tiznow.

"With the benefit of hindsight", O'Brien later recalled, "it was an unrealistic target to ask him to do that after having such a tough season and racing against the older horses, but it was the belief that was in him, the belief that everyone had in him, that we thought it could be possible that it could happen. I remember when he came in, he was after trying so hard he was almost crying. He was so genuine."

Galileo's retirement was announced immediately after the race.

Race record

Assessment
Galileo was named European Champion Three-Year-Old at the Cartier Racing Awards.

In the 2001 International Classification (the forerunner of the World Thoroughbred Racehorse Rankings), Galileo was assessed at 129 (equal with Fantastic Light), making him the third highest rated horse behind Sakhee and Point Given.

Galileo was given a final Timeform rating of 134.

Stud career

Galileo was retired to stand as a stallion for the Coolmore Stud. He originally operated as a "shuttle" stallion, standing at Coolmore's main farm at Fethard, County Tipperary Ireland during the Northern Hemisphere breeding season and moving to its Australian branch in the Hunter Region, New South Wales for the Southern Hemisphere breeding season. However, since 2006, he stood exclusively in Ireland.

Galileo earned his first title as the leading sire in Great Britain and Ireland in 2008 thanks to his first Derby winner New Approach. He regained the title in 2010 when Frankel made his debut, and repeated in 2011 through 2020 inclusive. Since 2008, his stud fee was privately negotiated, but in 2018 he was reputed to be the most expensive stallion in the world. For breeders who were not associates of Coolmore Stud, the fee had "long been north of €400,000" and was suggested to be as high as €600,000. At the height of his stud career, Galileo generated an estimated €40 million per year in stud fees for Coolmore.

At the time of his death on 10 July 2021, he had sired 338 stakes winners, 228 of which were group winners. In August 2018, Sizzling gave Galileo his 328th European group race win as a sire, taking him past the record previously held by his own sire Sadler's Wells.

On 9 November 2019, Magic Wand became his 84th individual Group/Grade One winner, putting him level with Danehill for the most such winners sired. He broke this record when Peaceful won the Irish 1000 Guineas in June 2020. On the same day he died, Bolshoi Ballet became his 92nd G1 winner. In 2022, Magical Lagoon became his 95th G1 winner by taking the Irish Oaks.
Proud and Regal is 97th G1 winner of it

In 2019, Anthony Van Dyck became his fourth Epsom Derby winner (with New Approach, Ruler of the World, and Australia). This tied him with Cyllene, Waxy, Sir Peter Teazle, Blandford and Montjeu for the number of Derby winners sired. He broke this record when Serpentine won the Derby in 2020. After Minding's victory in the 2016 1000 Guineas, Galileo had become the sire of winners of all five British Classics. In the 2016 Prix de l'Arc de Triomphe, he sired the top three finishers (Found, Highland Reel and Order of St George). In the 2019 Derby, he was the sire, grandsire or great-grandsire of all runners but Sir Dragonet, who was related to Urban Sea through his full sister All Too Beautiful. In 2020, he was the sire of the Love, winner of the 1000 Guineas, Epsom Oaks and the Darley Yorkshire Oaks.

In September 2008, Galileo underwent surgery for colic.

In early 2021, Galileo injured his near-fore foot and underwent another surgery. He failed to respond to treatment and was euthanized on 10 July. When announcing the death, John Magnier of Coolmore commented, ""The effect he is having on the breed through his sons and daughters will be a lasting legacy, and his phenomenal success really is unprecedented."

O'Brien noted that as a sire Galileo was notable for passing his own determination down to his offspring. "You would train a lot of horses," he said, "different types of horses who all have different traits, but very few of them, in fact none of them, put that mental trait into their horses the way Galileo did. What he put into their minds, that genuineness, was out of this world."

Notable progeny

c = colt, f = filly, g = gelding† Noble Mission was awarded the Grand Prix de Saint-Cloud, after another Galileo son called Spiritjim was demoted from first after it was found that he tested positive for banned substances.

‡ Gleneagles was demoted from first to third in the 2014 Prix Jean-Luc Lagardère, after stewards deemed him to have interfered with the horse that finished second (Full Mast) and third (Territories).

Sire of sires
At the time of his death in 2021, Galileo had sired 20 sons who themselves became sires of Group/Grade 1 winners. Of these sons, Teofilio had sired the most G1 winners with 20, while Frankel was leading the sire list after having sired his first Derby winner. Both Australia and Gleneagles were in the top 20 of leading sires despite having just a few foal crops to represent them. In 2018, Frankel had finished fourth on the leading sire list, while Nathaniel finished fifth. New Approach was the sire of 2018 Derby winner Masar, while Teofilo sired Melbourne Cup winner Cross Counter.

Teofilo
Entered stud in 2008.

 New Approach 
Entered stud in 2009.

 Frankel 
Entered stud in 2013.

Nathaniel
Entered stud in 2013.

Broodmare Sire

Like his sire Galileo has become a sire of excellent broodmares whose offspring have achieved Group 1 success. He was the leading broodmare sire in Great Britain and Ireland of 2020 after finishing closely behind Pivotal in the previous years.

Pedigree

See also
 List of historical horses

References

External links
 Career 1-2-3 Colour Chart – Galileo''

1998 racehorse births
2021 racehorse deaths
Racehorses bred in Ireland
Racehorses trained in Ireland
Cartier Award winners
British Champion Thoroughbred Sires
Epsom Derby winners
Thoroughbred family 9-h
Chefs-de-Race
King George VI and Queen Elizabeth Stakes winners